Andrew Kerr (29 June 1931 – 24 December 1997) was a Scottish footballer, who played for Partick Thistle, Manchester City, Kilmarnock, Sunderland, Aberdeen, Inverness club Caledonian in the Highland Football League and also Glentoran in the Northern Ireland Football League.

Kerr started his career with Lugar Boswell Thistle in the Scottish Juniors having been born in the village of Lugar. Kerr also won two caps for Scotland, both of them in 1955. He was initially a defender and achieved his international recognition in that position, but achieved greater success at club level after being converted to a centre forward.

References

External links 
Profile at AFC Heritage Trust
Profile at The Stat Cat

1931 births
1997 deaths
Footballers from East Ayrshire
Association football forwards
Scottish footballers
Scotland international footballers
Partick Thistle F.C. players
Manchester City F.C. players
Kilmarnock F.C. players
Sunderland A.F.C. players
Aberdeen F.C. players
Glentoran F.C. players
Scottish Football League players
English Football League players
NIFL Premiership players
Scottish Junior Football Association players
Scottish Football League representative players
Lugar Boswell Thistle F.C. players
Scotland B international footballers
Association football defenders